The 10th British Empire Trophy was a Formula One motor race held on 25 May 1948 at the Douglas Circuit, in Douglas, Isle of Man. The 36-lap race was won by ERA driver Geoffrey Ansell. David Hampshire finished second in a Delage, and Leslie Brooke was third in an ERA. Bob Gerard started from pole position in his ERA but retired with brake problems. Reg Parnell (Maserati) and Leslie Johnson (ERA) set joint fastest lap.

Results

References

External links

British Empire Trophy
British Empire Trophy
Brit
1948 in the Isle of Man